David Confesor Paulino (born February 6, 1994) is a Dominican professional baseball pitcher who is a free agent. He has played in Major League Baseball (MLB) for the Houston Astros, Toronto Blue Jays and Philadelphia Phillies.

Career

Detroit Tigers
Paulino was signed by the Detroit Tigers as an international free agent in 2010. He made his professional debut in 2011 with the Dominican Summer League Tigers and spent 2012 and 2013 with the Gulf Coast Tigers. In 2013, he underwent Tommy John surgery which caused him to miss the 2014 season.

Houston Astros
On September 13, 2013, Paulino was acquired by the Houston Astros as a player to be named later in an earlier trade for José Veras. Paulino made his debut in the Astros organization in 2015 with the Tri-City ValleyCats and also played for the Quad Cities River Bandits and Lancaster JetHawks. The Astros added him to their 40-man roster after the season. Paulino was promoted to the major leagues on September 6, 2016.

On July 1, 2017, Paulino was suspended 80 games without pay for testing positive for a performance enhancing substance. From that point on, he would not play again for the rest of 2017, but finished with a 2–0 record and a 6.52 ERA in six starts.

Toronto Blue Jays
On July 30, 2018, the Astros traded Paulino, Ken Giles, and Héctor Pérez to the Toronto Blue Jays for Roberto Osuna. The Blue Jays activated Paulino from the disabled list on September 5. Paulino was designated for assignment on August 7, 2019. He was released on August 10.

Philadelphia Phillies
On January 18, 2021, Paulino signed a minor league contract with the Philadelphia Phillies organization and was invited to Spring Training. He was assigned to the Triple-A Lehigh Valley IronPigs to start the season. After posting a 4.35 ERA with 58 strikeouts in 25 appearances with Triple-A Lehigh Valley, Paulino's contract was selected by the Phillies. He made his Phillies debut on August 13, pitching 2 innings and giving up 2 runs. The following day, he was designated for assignment. He was outrighted to Lehigh Valley on August 16.

See also
List of Major League Baseball players suspended for performance-enhancing drugs

References

External links

1994 births
Living people
Buffalo Bisons (minor league) players
Corpus Christi Hooks players
Dominican Republic expatriate baseball players in Canada
Dominican Republic expatriate baseball players in the United States
Dominican Republic sportspeople in doping cases
Dominican Summer League Tigers players
Fresno Grizzlies players
Gulf Coast Astros players
Gulf Coast Tigers players
Houston Astros players
Lancaster JetHawks players
Major League Baseball pitchers
Major League Baseball players from the Dominican Republic
Major League Baseball players suspended for drug offenses
Philadelphia Phillies players
Quad Cities River Bandits players
Tigres del Licey players
Toronto Blue Jays players
Tri-City ValleyCats players